Chris Mortensen (born November 7, 1951) is an American journalist providing reports for ESPN's Sunday NFL Countdown, Monday Night Countdown, SportsCenter, ESPN Radio, and ESPN.com.

Early life
Mortensen attended North Torrance High School in Torrance, California, and El Camino College before serving two years in the Army during the Vietnam War.

Career
Mortensen says his journalism career began once he realized that he no longer could compete in football, basketball and baseball beyond high school. He forsook his goal of being a teacher and coach when he realized how competitive sports journalism could be. Since starting his career with the Daily Breeze newspaper in Torrance, California in 1969, Mortensen has received 18 awards in journalism. In 1978, he won the National Headliner Award for Investigative Reporting in all categories. In 1999, he made a film on The Unreal Story of Professional Wrestling.

Atlanta Journal-Constitution
From 1983 to 1990, Mortensen worked at the Atlanta Journal-Constitution, filing investigative reports and covering the Atlanta Braves (1983–85), Atlanta Falcons (1985–86) and the NFL (1987–89). In 1987, he was given the George Polk Award for his reporting.

The National
He previously covered the NFL for The National (1989–90), where he was one of the first writers hired by editor Frank Deford.

ESPN
Since first appearing on ESPN in 1991, Mortensen has reported for the network's Emmy Award-winning programs NFL GameDay/NFL Countdown/Sunday NFL Countdown and the Outside the Lines series. He worked as an analyst for ESPN's coverage of the NFL Draft.

Domino's controversy 
On Dec 30, 2015 Mortensen and Adam Schefter were caught shilling for Dominos on twitter without revealing they had been paid to do so. Mortensen tweeted out "There’s nothing better on NYE than some football and @Dominos #HomeOnNYE". On the same day Schefter tweeted "NYE means college football and @Dominos pizaa. The tweets violated both basic journalistic standards as well as FTC regulations.

Deflategate controversy

On January 21, 2015, Mortensen reported erroneously that 11 of the 12 footballs used in the AFC Championship Game on January 18, 2015, between the New England Patriots and the Indianapolis Colts were 2 pounds per square inch (PSI) under NFL regulation.

The Wells Report findings showed that only 1 of 22 readings (with each ball tested twice with different gauges except the intercepted ball) showed to be under by 2 PSI. The rest ranged from 1.8 to 0.2 PSI below. Despite being debunked in the Wells report, Mortensen's original story remained posted on ESPN as late as August 13, 2015, with no retraction, clarification or apology.

Mortensen was to appear on WEEI's Dennis and Callahan radio show on July 31, 2015, but cancelled. According to WEEI, Mortensen stated he "will not allow WEEI, [Patriots owner Robert] Kraft or anybody to make me the centerpiece of a story that has been misreported far beyond anything I did in the first 48 hours."

On August 3, 2015, Mortensen was interviewed on ESPN's Dan Le Batard Show regarding his controversial tweet about the under-inflated footballs. Shortly after, he deleted the tweet from Twitter. As of August 27, 2015, Mortensen stands by his initial report.

On August 27, Mortensen claimed on the Doug & Wolf Radio Show in Arizona that Patriot's Robert and Jonathan Kraft called him and apologized. Jonathan Kraft rejected that claim, stating, "We don’t blame the reporters, we blame their sources... We haven’t [apologized] and we have no need to. Our issue is with the people who were leaking misinformation."

Other work
Mortensen is the author of the 1991 book Playing for Keeps: How One Man Kept the Mob from Sinking Its Hooks into Pro Football.

Personal life
Mortensen is married to Micki Mortensen. Their son, Alex Mortensen, is a coach and former professional quarterback. Mortensen is a Christian.

On January 15, 2016, Mortensen announced via an ESPN statement that he had been diagnosed with Stage 4 throat cancer and would consequently be taking a leave of absence from his on-air work at the cable network.

References

External links

American reporters and correspondents
American sports radio personalities
American male journalists
American sportswriters
ESPN.com
ESPN people
ESPN Radio
National Football League announcers
United States Army soldiers
1951 births
Living people
21st-century American journalists